Perry's or Perrys may refer to:

Arts, entertainment, and media
Perry's Chemical Engineers' Handbook, a reference book
The Perrys, a Southern Gospel quartet

Brands and enterprises
Perry's Ice Cream, an American company 
Perrys Motor Sales, British company
Perry's Nut House, a tourist stop and store in Maine, United States

See also
Perry (disambiguation)
Perry's Cove, Newfoundland and Labrador